This is a list of women writers who were born in Norway or  whose writings are closely associated with the country.

A
Anne Lise Aas (1925–2020), interior designer and journal editor
Anna Caspari Agerholt (1892–1943), women's rights activist, writer and educator, covered the history of the Norwegian women's movement
Astrid Hjertenæs Andersen (1915–1985), early modernist poet, travel writer 
Ella Anker (1870–1958), journalist, playwright, pamphleteer
Nini Roll Anker (1873–1942), prolific realistic novelist, playwright
Ingeborg Arvola (born 1974), novelist, children's writer
Elise Aubert (1837–1909), novelist, short story writer, non-fiction writer

B
Irene Ibsen Bille (1901–1985), novelist, playwright
Inger Bråtveit (born 1978), novelist, children's writer
Toril Brekke (born 1949), novelist, short story writer, children's writer, works on women's rights
Hanne Bramness (born 1959), poet
Gerd Brantenberg (born 1941], novelist, dramatist, feminist
Elin Brodin (born 1963), novelist
Magdalene Sophie Buchholm (1758–1825), poet, only acknowledge women writer of her times

C
Camilla Carlson (1930–1990), poet, novelist, critic
Solveig Christov (1918–1984), novelist, short story writer, playwright
Camilla Collett (1813–1895), novelist, feminist essayist
Marie Colban (1814–1884), novelist, short story writer

D
Gro Dahle (born 1962), poet, children's writer
Ingri d'Aulaire, English-language children's writer, together with husband Edgar Parin d'Aulaire
Elisabeth Dored (1813–1895), novelist, author of I Loved Tiberius set in ancient Rome
Conradine Birgitte Dunker (1780–1866), memoirist
Astrid Sverresdotter Dypvik (born 1977), journalist, historian, non-fiction writer

E
Clara Thue Ebbell (1880–1971), young adult writer, biographer, feminist
Marit Eikemo (born 1971), essayist, novelist, journalist, magazine editor
Ellen Einan (1931–2013), poet, illustrator
Rawdna Carita Eira (born 1970), Norwegian and Sámi playwright, short story writer
Anne Karin Elstad (1938–2012), author of best-selling novels, including the four-part series on Julie 
Magli Elster (1912–1993), poet, literary critic  
Dorothe Engelbretsdatter (1634–1716), poet, Norway's first female author

F
Karin Fossum (born 1954), widely translated crime fiction writer, known as the "Norwegian queen of crime"

G
Ågot Gjems-Selmer  (1858–1926), writer of works on family life, children's writer
Beate Grimsrud (born 1963), novelist, playwright, children's writer

H
Magnhild Haalke (1885–1984), widely recognized author of 30 works, mainly novels
Ingeborg Refling Hagen (1895–1989), prolific novelist, children's writer, poet
Inger Hagerup (1905–1985), poet, dramatist, anti-Nazi writings   
Marie Hamsun (1881–1969), actress, poet, children's writer, some works translated into English
Lillemor von Hanno (1900–1984), actress, novelist, playwright
Inger Elisabeth Hansen (born 1950), poet
Ebba Haslund (1917–2009), novelist, short story writer, playwright, essayist, critic, author of Nothing Happened
Torill Thorstad Hauger (1943–2014), non-fiction writer, children's writer 
Tone Hellesund (born 1967), non-fiction writer specializing in gender studies
Vera Henriksen (1927–2016), historical novelist, playwright, non-fiction writer
Vigdis Hjorth (born 1959), novelist, children's writer
Tone Hødnebø (born 1962), poet 
Gunvor Hofmo (1921–1995), influential modernist poet
Anne Holt (born 1958), best-selling, widely translated crime writer
Åsta Holth (1904–1999), novelist, poet, short story writer
Aslaug Høydal (1916–2007), novelist, poet, children's writer, educator
Ida Hegazi Høyer (born 1981), novelist

J
Anna Jacobsen (1924–2004), Norwegian Sami writer, translator and publisher
Caroline Schytte Jensen (1848–1935), songwriter, composer
Margaret Johansen (1923–2013), novelist, short story writer, feminist
Ragnhild Jølsen (1875–1908), reactionary writer, works on conflicts between rural society and industrial communities
Lizzie Juvkam (1883–1869), novelist

K
Mette Karlsvik (born 1978), journalist, novelist
Mahmona Khan (born 1973), Pakistani-Norwegian journalist, non-fiction writer
Gustava Kielland (1800–1889), songwriter, memoirist
Liv Køltzow (born 1945), novelist, playwright, essayist, feminist writer
Christiane Koren (1764–1815), poet, playwright, diarist

L
Sissel Lange-Nielsen (born 1931), novelist, critic, journalist
Britt Karin Larsen (born 1945), poet, novelist, works tracing the Romany people in Norway
Trude Brænne Larssen (born 1967), novelist
Marita Liabø (born 1971), novelist
Tove Lie (1942–2000), poet
Sofie Aubert Lindbæk (1875–1953), novelist, critic, educator
Unni Lindell (born 1957), crime fiction writer, children's writer
Hilde Lindset (born 1978), short story writer, educator
Merethe Lindstrøm (born 1963), novelist, short story writer
Cecilie Løveid (born 1951), playwright, children's writer, poem on Breivik

M

Ragnhild Magerøy (1920–2010), historical novelist, author of the Gunhild trilogy on 19th-century rural society
Trude Marstein (born 1973), novelist, essayist, some works translated into English
Karin Moe (born 1945), poet, prose writer, critic
Toril Moi (born 1953), academic works on women's writing, feminism, now based in the United States
Dagne Groven Myhren (born 1940), Norwegian literature researcher, folklorist
Marit Myrvoll (born 1953), Sami social anthropologist, museum director

N
Marja Bål Nango (born 1988), Norwegian Sami film director and screenwriter
Torborg Nedreaas (1906–1987), short story writer, novelist, playwright, evoking class differences
Åse-Marie Nesse (1934–2001) philologist, poet
Tove Nilsen (born 1952), novelist, children's writer, critic
Anne-Pia Nygård (born 1977), autobiography in Nynorsk

O
Hanne Ørstavik (born 1969), novelist
Sara Margrethe Oskal (born 1970), Sami writer, actress, film director
Mari Osmundsen (born 1951), pen-name of Anne Kristine Halling, novelist, children's writer
Sissel Benneche Osvold (born 1945), journalist
Gunnhild Øyehaug (born 1975), poet, short story writer

P
Synnøve Persen (born 1950), Sami poet, biographer, artist
Helvi Poutasuo (1943–2017), Finnish Sami teacher, translator and newspaper editor

R

Anne B. Ragde (born 1957), novelist, children's writer, crime fiction writer, author of Berlin Poplars
Eva Ramm (born 1925), psychologist, essayist, novelist, children's writer

S
Wera Sæther (born 1945) psychologist, poet, novelist, essayist, children's writer
Cora Sandel (1880–1974), short story writer, novelist, painter, author of the Alberta Trilogy
Mathilde Schjøtt (1844–1926), non-fiction writer, critic, biographer, feminist
Constance Wiel Schram (1890–1955), non-fiction writer, biographer, translator, feminist
Åsne Seierstad (born 1970), journalist, non-fiction works including The Bookseller of Kabul
Solfrid Sivertsen (born 1947), librarian, poet, novelist, children's writer
Sarita Skagnes (born 1969), Indian-born women's activist, memoirist 
Amalie Skram (1846–1905), short story writer, novelist, feminist
Kirsten Sødal (born 1935), children's writer
Kristin Solberg (born 1982), journalist, television reporter
Kjersti Løken Stavrum (born 1969), journalist, editor, secretary general of the Norwegian Press Association

T

Marie Takvam (1926–2008), poet, novelist, children's writer, actress
Magdalene Thoresen (1819–1903), Danish-born Norwegian poet, short story writer, playwright
Astrid Tollefsen (1897–1973), poet, lyricist
Marit Tusvik (born 1951), poet, children's writer, playwright

U
Linn Ullmann (born 1966), journalist, novelist

V
Aslaug Vaa (1889–1965), poet, playwright 
Halldis Moren Vesaas (1907–1995), poet, children's writer, depictions of women's life
Anne-Catharina Vestly (1920–2008), popular children's writer, widely translated
Bjørg Vik (1935–2018), novelist, dramatist, feminist writer, some works translated into English

W
Torild Wardenær (born 1951), poet, playwright
Herbjørg Wassmo (born 1942), poet, novelist
Elisabeth Welhaven (1815–1901), salonist, short story writer
Marie Wexelsen (1832–1911), poet, children's writer, novelist, hymnist

References

See also
List of Norwegian writers
List of women writers

-
Norwegian
Writers
Writers, women